Events in the year 2018 in the Democratic Republic of the Congo.

Incumbents
 President: Joseph Kabila
 Prime Minister: Bruno Tshibala

Events

May
8 May – The 2018 Équateur province Ebola virus outbreak begins.

July 
24 July – The WHO declares the Équateur province Ebola virus outbreak over.

August 
1 August – Another Ebola virus outbreak was confirmed in Kivu in the eastern region of the country.

December
23 December – scheduled date for the Democratic Republic of the Congo general election, 2018

Deaths

30 March – André Bo-Boliko Lokonga, politician (b. 1934).
3 July – Barthélemy Mukenge, politician (b. 1925).
26 October – Valentin Masengo Mkinda, Roman Catholic prelate (b. 1940).

References

 
2010s in the Democratic Republic of the Congo
Years of the 21st century in the Democratic Republic of the Congo
Democratic Republic of the Congo
Democratic Republic of the Congo